In mathematics, Castelnuovo's contraction theorem is used in the classification theory of algebraic surfaces  to construct the minimal model of a given smooth algebraic surface.

This contraction morphism is sometimes called a blowdown, which is the inverse operation of blowup. The curve  is also called an exceptional curve of the first kind.

References 
 

Algebraic surfaces
Theorems in geometry